For Minnehaha Falls in Minnesota, see Minnehaha Falls

Minnehaha Falls is a series of cascades located on Falls Creek in Rabun County, Georgia. The waterfalls descend about 100 feet over a stepped rock formation. The falls are near Lake Rabun, within the boundaries of the Chattooga River Ranger District of the Chattahoochee National Forest.

The falls are named for Minnehaha, a fictional character in the epic poem The Song of Hiawatha.

The falls can be reached by a short trail (0.4 miles) from Bear Gap Road called the Minnehaha Trail.  The trail is maintained by the U.S. Forest Service.

External links
U.S. Forest Service Website for Minnehaha Falls
Minnehaha Falls Trail info and photos

Waterfalls of Georgia (U.S. state)
Protected areas of Rabun County, Georgia
Chattahoochee-Oconee National Forest
Waterfalls of Rabun County, Georgia